

Batalik is a village and military base in Ladakh, India, located in a narrow section of the Indus river valley, close to the Line of Control with Pakistan-administered Baltistan. It was a focal point of the Kargil War because of its strategic location between Kargil, Leh and Baltistan. In 1999, the Kargil war was fought in this region.

Batalik is 56 km from Kargil and is located in the Brokpa region. Administratively, it is treated as a hamlet of the Silmo village.

Transport

Road
Batalik is connected by road to other places in Kargil and Leh via the Kargil–Batalik–Khaltse Road which forms a "detour" from the National Highway 1 between Kargil and Khalatse.

Rail
The nearest major railway stations to Batalik are Sopore railway station and Srinagar railway station located  271 and 277 kilometres away respectively.

Air
The nearest airport is at Kargil, 60 kilometres away, but it is currently non-operational. The next-nearest major airport is Leh Airport located at a distance of 205 kilometres.

See also
 Yaldor Sub Sector
 Manoj Kumar Pandey (The Hero of Batalik)

References

 Sources
 

Villages in Kargil district
Kargil War